La is a district (muang) of Oudomxay province in northwestern Laos.

References

Districts of Oudomxay province